Auguste Louis Albéric, Prince of Arenberg (15 September 1837 – 24 January 1924) was a French noble and monarchist politician, 2nd (French) Duke of Arenberg. He was noted for his great wealth and extensive properties throughout France, in particular at Menetou-Salon (Cher).

Early life
The Prince of Arenberg was born in Paris on 15 September 1837. He was the third son of Pierre d'Alcantara Charles Marie, duc d'Arenberg (1790–1877) and Alix Marie Charlotte de Talleyrand-Périgord (1808–1842). His father was made a peer of France in 1827 and became a naturalized French subject by order of King Charles X in 1828. Because both of his older brothers died prematurely, he inherited his father's title. His elder sister Marie Nicolette was married to Charles de Mérode, 10th Marquess of Westerloo. After his mother's death in 1842, his father remarried to Caroline Léopoldine Jeanne, Princess of Kaunitz-Rietberg-Questenberg, in 1860.

His paternal grandfather was Louis Engelbert, 6th Duke of Arenberg and his uncle was Prosper Louis, 7th Duke of Arenberg.

Career
Arenberg served in the Chamber of Deputies from 1877 to 1881.  He was elected as the official candidate of the MacMahon government, winning the poll due to the abstention of republican voters disenchanted with his predecessor.  In the Chamber, he voted consistently with the monarchist Right and conservatives. He voted against the legalization of divorce.

Returned to parliament as a monarchist candidate again in 1889, Arenberg continued his opposition to republican government.  After Rerum novarum and Pope Leo XIII's recognition of the Third Republic, however, Arenberg changed his rhetoric, campaigning in 1893 as a "liberal republican".  In the Chamber, he concentrated on colonial issues, in particular those concerning Africa; among his projects were securing free navigation of the Niger River and delineating Anglo-French colonial boundaries.

Defeated in the 1902 elections and failing to secure reelection again in 1906, Arenberg retired from politics, but remained active in public life. He was the first president of the procolonial Comité de l'Afrique française and remained active with the organization until his death.

Later life
A convinced Catholic himself, during 1895 he was one of the organizers of a failed attempt to build a mosque in Paris through private donations.  From 1896 he was also president of the Compagnie universelle du canal maritime de Suez, and he was a member of the Institut de France (Académie des beaux-arts) from 1897.

Personal life
On 18 June 1868, Arenberg was married to Jeanne Marie Louise de Greffulhe (1850–1891). She was a daughter of Count Louis-Charles Greffulhe and Félicité Pauline de La Rochefoucauld and sister of Henry Greffulhe (a personal friend of author Marcel Proust). They were the parents of four children:

 Alix Jeanne Marie d'Arenberg (1869–1924), who married Pierre Adolphe, Marquis de Laguiche, a descendant of Louis Henri, Duke of Bourbon.
 Charles-Louis Pierre d'Arenberg (1871–1919), who married Antoinette Hélène Emma Louise de Gramont de Lesparre (1883–1958), a granddaughter of Agénor, 10th Duke of Gramont and cousin of Armand de Gramont, 12th Duke of Gramont.
 Louise Marie Charlotte d'Arenberg (1872–1958), who married Louis Antoine Melchior, Marquis de Vogüé.
 Ernest Hélie Charles Marie (1886–1915), who died during World War I.

The Prince died on 24 January 1924.

Descendants
Through his son Charles, he was a grandfather of Prince Charles Auguste Armand d'Arenberg (1905–1967),3rd (French) Duke,  who married American heiress Margaret (née Bedford) Bancroft in 1960. They were the parents of one son, Prince Pierre Frederick Henri d'Arenberg (b. 1961), 4th (French) Duke,  before his death in 1967.  She remarried to Emmanuel Jacques de Crussol, Duke d'Uzès.

References

Members of the Académie des beaux-arts
Arenberg, Auguste-Louis-Alberic, prince d'
Auguste-Louis-Alberic, prince d'
Auguste-Louis-Alberic
Arenberg, Auguste-Louis-Alberic, prince d'
Arenberg, Auguste-Louis-Alberic, prince d'
Honorary Knights Grand Commander of the Order of the Star of India